The Penny Friend is a musical with music, lyrics, and book by William Roy based on a play by J. M. Barrie, A Kiss for Cinderella. It featured Bernadette Peters in her first Off-Broadway role. William Roy later worked with Peters as a writer, arranger and conductor for her nightclub act.

Production history
The Penny Friend opened off-Broadway at Stage 73 on December 26, 1966, and closed on January 22, 1967, after 32 performances. The director was Benno D. Frank, and musical numbers were staged by Lou Kristofer. The producer was Thomas Hammond (Bernadette Peters' manager).

Plot summary
The story involves a girl who thinks that she is Cinderella, and whose friends go along with her story.  After talking about attending a ball, she actually appears to be at the ball.  However, it is soon evident that her story is all fantasy. In reality Cinderella is lying unconscious in a snow bank. She is brought to a hospital where she dies.

Characters and cast
Cinderella -- Bernadette Peters
Mrs. Maloney—Georgia Creighton
Mr. McGill—Bill Drew
Kate Bodie—Charlotte Fairchild
Maudie—Terry Forman
George—Dewey Golkin
Lady—Sherill Price
Invite—Jimmy Rivers
Policeman -- Jamie Ross
Mr. Jennings—John Senger
Charles Bodie -- Michael Wager

References

External links
 Lortel Database
"A Kiss for Cinderella" on Internet Movie Database

Off-Broadway musicals
1966 musicals
J. M. Barrie
Musicals based on plays
Works based on Cinderella